Force majeure is a common clause in contracts that frees parties from legal obligation when an extraordinary event or circumstance occurs.

Force Majeure may also refer to:

Arts, entertainment, and media

Literature
 Force Majeure,  a 2007 novel by Daniel O'Mahony
 Force Majeure, a 1991 novel by Bruce Wagner

Music
 Force Majeure (band), an English new wave group, formed in 1983
 Force Majeure (Doro album), 1989
 Force Majeure (H.E.A.T album), 2022
 Force Majeure (Tangerine Dream album), 1979

Television
 "Force Majeure" (Millennium), the thirteenth episode of the first season of the American crime-thriller television series Millennium
 "Force Majeure" (The Unit), an episode of the television series The Unit
 "Force Majeure" (Under the Dome),  the third episode of the second season of the CBS drama series Under the Dome

Other uses in arts, entertainment, and media
 Force Majeure, an Australian contemporary dance collective 
 Force majeure, a 1989 film by French director Pierre Jolivet
 Force Majeure (film), a 2014 Swedish film
 Force Majeure (tour), the title of comedian Eddie Izzard's 2013 world tour

Other uses
 Force Majeure Vineyards (wine), a boutique winery in Washington state

See also
 Act of God
 Force (disambiguation)
 Major Force
 Natural disaster